Kepler-1704b is a super-Jupiter on a highly eccentric orbit around the star Kepler-1704. It has a mass of 4.51 . The planet's distance from its star varies from 0.16 to 3.9 AU. It is a failed hot Jupiter, been scattered from its birth orbit to orbit with periastron just above tidal circularization distance.

Characteristics 
Kepler-1704b is much more massive than Jupiter, at 4.51 MJ. The high planetary mass makes Kepler-1704b a super-Jupiter. Kepler-1704b goes on a highly eccentric 2.7 year-long (988.88 days) orbit around its star as well as transiting. The extreme eccentricity yields a temperature difference of up to 700 K.

Star 
The star, Kepler-1704, is a G2, 5745-kelvin star  from Earth and the sun. The high radius for the star's mass hints that Kepler-1704 is not a main-sequence star.

See also
Gas giant
List of planet types
Kepler-419b
HD 80606 b
HR 5183 b
HD 20782 b

References

Exoplanets discovered in 2021
Giant planets